Heeseberg is a Samtgemeinde ("collective municipality") in the district of Helmstedt, in Lower Saxony, Germany. It is situated approximately 20 km southwest of Helmstedt, and 35 km southeast of Braunschweig. Its seat is in the village Jerxheim.

The Samtgemeinde Heeseberg consists of the following municipalities:

 Beierstedt 
 Gevensleben 
 Jerxheim
 Söllingen 

Samtgemeinden in Lower Saxony